This is a list of fellows of the Royal Society elected in 1988.

Fellows

Janis Antonovics
Athelstan Laurence Johnson Beckwith (1930–2010)
Sidney van den Bergh
Derek Bradley
Nam-Hai Chua
Alan Cowey  (1935–2012)
Alan Herbert Cowley
Keith Gordon Cox (1933–1998)
Lionel Vivian Crawford
David Olaf Edwards
Charles Thomas Elliott
Trevor Evans  (1927–2010)
James T. Fitzsimons
Margaret Mary Gowing (1921–1998) (statute 12)
John Edwin (Jack) Harris
Alan Kenneth Head (1925–2010)
 Sir Brian Hoskins
Noel Hush
Jacob Israelachvili
George Kalmus
Henricus Gerardus Jacobus Maria Kuypers (1925–1989)
Tomas Lindahl
Alan Lindsay Mackay
Robin Milner(1934–2010)
Ashesh Prosad Mitra (1927–2007)
Salvador Moncada
Robin Milner (1934–2010)
John Gareth Morris
Howard Redfern Morris
John Graham Nicholls
John Joseph Thomas Owen
Barbara Pearse
Hugh Pelham
William Geraint Price
Philip Geoffrey Saffman (1931–2008) 
Conjeeveram Srirangachari Seshadri
Eric Manvers Shooter
David Smith
Robert Stephen John Sparks
John Wickham Steeds
Robert Henry Symons(1934–2006)
Jeffrey Clifton Watkins

Foreign members

Vladimir Igorevich Arnold  (1937–2010)
Christian de Duve (1917–2013)
Jacques Friedel (1921–2014)
Ernst Mayr (1904–2005)
Henry Taube (1915–2005)
Howard Martin Temin (1934–1994)

References

1988
1988 in science
1988 in the United Kingdom